Stanley Park is a non-profit privately owned park including an arboretum and botanical garden, located in Westfield, Massachusetts. It is open to the public daily without charge from May to November. Although the park is closed during the winter, people can still enter the park at their own risk. The duck pond area is monitored 24/7 with three security cameras, which are accessible on the park's websites. These security cameras were installed about 6 months after three teenagers killed a Muscovy Duck, in November 2011. Westfield Bank donated the security cameras, after public outcry that the park did not have any surveillance on the duck pond area.

In 2017 a volunteer at the park created a memorial sign to be placed in sight of the life size bronze statue, so people would know why there is a statue there, and can read more about it if they scanned the QR code with their phone.

Conservation 
As of 2018, Stanley Park has prohibited the use of bread for feeding the park's ducks and geese. Stanley Park also has over 300 acres of protected woodland with miles of hiking trails.

List of animals that live at the duck pond

 American Black Ducks
 American Pekin Ducks
 Swans
 Brecon Buff Geese
 Snow Geese

Occasionally wood ducks will visit the pond in the winter, and in the summer some park guests have seen great blue herons.

A greylag goose lived in the pond until November 2, 2018 when he died. He was approximately 35 years old.

The park was established in 1945 by the philanthropist Frank Stanley Beveridge. It includes a number of gardens, listed below, as well as a playground, soccer fields, tennis courts, picnic area, wildlife sanctuary, colonial pond, covered bridge, and blacksmith shop.

American Wildflower Society Display Garden - indigenous shade-tolerant New England wildflowers, with peak season in early May.
Arboretum (1,000 acres) - trees and shrubs with a  fountain.
Bog garden
Herb garden - fragrant, culinary, and medicinal herbs; mid-May through mid-October.
Asian garden and teahouse - alpine conifers, rhododendrons, azaleas, and flowering deciduous shrubs with an authentic bamboo Japanese Tea House. Peak season mid-May through mid-June.
Rhododendron Display Garden - hundreds of rare species, sponsored by the Massachusetts Chapter of the American Rhododendron Society, with peak season mid-May through early June.
Rose Gardens - Over 50 varieties and 2,500 bushes. Winner of the "Outstanding Public Rose Garden" Award from All-America Rose Selections.

Stanley Park is located on Western Avenue in the suburban town of Westfield, Massachusetts. It was founded by its benefactor Frank Stanley Beveridge in 1949. The park began on a  plot, but now spans  with multiple gardens, trails, and playing fields. It is only a short walking distance from Westfield State University, located across Western Avenue to the northwest from Stanley Park.

History of Frank Stanley Beveridge

Frank Stanley Beveridge was born in Nova Scotia, Canada in 1879, and he moved to western Massachusetts in 1900 to attend Mount Hermon School in Northfield. After graduating, he traveled to New York where he married and began a family. At this time, Beveridge was very successful in his work and began Stanley Home Products in Westfield, Massachusetts. popular for their Stanley Home Parties attracting housekeepers looking for quality cleaning supplies. Stanley Home Products is still around to this very day (although its ownership has since changed hands). Frank Stanley also founded the Frank Stanley Beveridge Foundation in 1947, to both perform charitable works and to further his legacy. After he died in 1956, the foundation still honors his contributions to the community.

General information
Stanley Park’s hours of operation are from 7:00 am until nightfall every day. It is open beginning on the first Saturday in May and closes for the season on the last Sunday in November. The park is open to the public and does not charge for admission.

Stanley Park features multiple natural walking trails, throughout the woods and along the Little River, as well as leading to a variety of ponds, gardens, and wildlife sanctuary. Along with experiencing nature, Stanley Park features operating mills, a meetinghouse, blacksmith shop, Asian tea house, and dinosaur tracks. For recreation, the park has many playing fields, cross country course, a playground, and pavilions.

Park attractions

Primary points of interest
 Arboretum - Approximately  of land; many trees, shrubs, as well as a  fountain
 Colonial Pond - Many ducks and swans, two functioning mills: the Old Mill and Water Mill, and a quaint Covered Bridge
 Rose Garden - More than fifty roses species and 2,500 bushes
 Wildlife Sanctuary -  of trails running beside Little River

Other attractions
Other attractions include:

 ADA Playscape
 Angel Of Independence Statue
 Asian Garden/Tea House
 Basketball Courts
 Beveridge Pavilion
 Blacksmith Shop
 Carriage Shed
 Cathy’s Garden and Pavilion
 Cross Country Course
 Dinosaur Tracks
 Dorthy Perkins Garden
 Duck Pond
 Enchanted Oak
 Eternal Light, dedicated by Clare Boothe Luce
 Evelyn B. Rose Garden
 Frog Pond
 Herb Garden
 Lacrosse and Soccer Fields
 Meeting House
 Mill Shop
 Recreation Picnic Area
 Rhododendron Display Garden
 Shrine Area
 The Reeds
 Tennis Courts
 Woodland Wildflower Garden

Events

Carillon concerts
Stanley Park holds annual Carillon concerts every first and third Sunday each month. These concerts take place from May to November; beginning at 3:00 pm and ending at 4:00 pm.

Friday Mornings for Children
Stanley Park offers various children’s activities during the summer on Friday mornings. These include story telling, skits, and puppets.

Zoo on the Go
Stanley Park hosts a travelling zoo on three occasions during the summer. Children may pet and ask zookeepers questions about the animals during the event.

Wheel Walk
An annual Wheel Walk to promote accessibility at the park. Food and games provided.

Other events 
Stanley Park is also the location of many events hosted by third-parties.

See also 
 List of botanical gardens in the United States

References

External links
 Official website

Arboreta in Massachusetts
Botanical gardens in Massachusetts
Cross country running courses in Massachusetts
Westfield, Massachusetts
Parks in Hampden County, Massachusetts
Japanese gardens in the United States